Rebecca Fowler (died October 9, 1685) was a woman convicted and executed for witchcraft in 17th-century Maryland. Around a dozen witch trials were conducted in Maryland during the 17th and 18th centuries, with most being acquitted. Fowler is the only documented legal execution of an alleged witch in Maryland history.

Life
Rebecca Fowler is believed to be the same Rebecca Logan who was transported from England to the Province of Maryland as an indentured servant in 1656. Logan was indentured to George Collins, a shoemaker and tobacco farmer. Once freed from her servitude, she married John Fowler, a fellow former indentured servant who had worked on the Collins plantation. The Fowler newlyweds purchased a parcel of land they named Fowler's Delight. The Fowlers became successful and eventually kept indentured servants of their own, including Francis Sandsbury. The evidence against Rebecca Fowler was not presented to the public during her witchcraft trial. Only Francis Sandsbury is named as an accuser, however, the court records mention "Several others" who were unnamed. Despite Rebecca's status as a landowner and Sandsbury's status as an indentured servant, the jurors believed Sandsbury's account. The jury stated its view that Fowler was guilty, but left the final determination of guilt to the judge.

The Prince George's County Court conluded that Rebecca Fowler, on or about 31 August 1685, "having not the feare of God before her eyes, but being led by the instigation of the Divell certain evill & dyabolicall Artes called witchcrafts inchantments charmes & sorceryes wickedly divelishly and feloniously at Mount Calvert ... & several other places ... did use practice & exercise in upon & against one Francis Sandsbury & Several others ... and their bodyes were very much the worse, consumed, pined & lamed ...." The judge ordered that Fowler be "hanged by the neck until dead." Fowler was executed by hanging on October 9th, 1685, in St. Mary's City, Maryland. Mount Calvert is now maintained as the Mount Calvert Historical and Archaeological Park by the Maryland-National Capital Park and Planning Commission.

Despite being the only person legally executed as a witch by a Maryland court, several other women were murdered as witches in Maryland history.

See also
Maryland Witch Trials
Moll Dyer

References

External links
Witch Hunts in the DC Area - Older Than You Think, Boundary Stones
Mount Calvert, Prince George's County, Tobaccoland.us
1685: Rebecca Fowler, Chesapeake witch, ExecutedToday.com
Witch Persecutions in Maryland, Wicca Magazine

1685 deaths
American indentured servants
American people executed for witchcraft
English emigrants
People executed by the Province of Maryland
People executed by the Thirteen Colonies by hanging
People from Calvert County, Maryland
People from Prince George's County, Maryland
St. Mary's City, Maryland
Violence against women in the United States
Witchcraft in Maryland